The 2010 Atlantic Sun Conference baseball tournament was held at Ken Dugan Field at Stephen Lee Marsh Stadium on the campus of Lipscomb University in Nashville, TN from May 25 through 28. Mercer won its fourth tournament championship, and first since 1983, to earn the Atlantic Sun Conference's automatic bid to the 2010 NCAA Division I baseball tournament.

This was the first of two Atlantic Sun Conference Baseball Tournaments to be hosted by Lipscomb University after eight years at Stetson University's in DeLand, FL. It was also the first year of postseason eligibility for three new conference members: Florida Gulf Coast, Kennesaw State, and North Florida, who replaced the departed Florida Atlantic, FIU, and UCF as members by transitioning to Division I.

Seeding 
The top six teams (based on conference results) from the conference earn invites to the tournament.

Results

All-Tournament Team

References 

Tournament
ASUN Conference Baseball Tournament
Atlantic Sun baseball tournament
Atlantic Sun baseball tournament